Hsawnghsup was one of the outlying Shan princely states in what is today Burma. 

The village of Thaungdut (Hsawnghsup) was formerly the residence of the Sawbwa of Hsawnghsup State. The capital is in the upper end of the Kabaw Valley.

History
Hsawnghsup state was founded in 1757; the first ruler was Sao Kan Po. Little is known of the history of the state before it was annexed to British Burma except that it had been a vassal state of the Kingdom of Burma.

Hsawnghsup formed an exclave located to the northwest of the Shan States, within the Upper Chindwin District of British Burma and bound to the west by the princely state of Manipur. Most of the territory of the state was dense forest.
In 1886 the ruler of Hsawnghsup remained loyal to the British during the rebellion of the prince of Wuntho.

Rulers
The rulers of Hsawnghsup bore the title of Saopha.

Saophas 
1560 - 1580 Sao Hseng Myin 
1580 - 1612 Sao Mauk Lwin 
1612 - 1628 Sao Shwe Yi 
1628 - 1650 Sao Khan Möng 
1650 - 1659 Sao Shwe Wad 1st time
1659 - 1663 Sao Moud Aung 
1663 - 1689 Sao Shwe Wad 2nd time 
1689 - 1703 Sao Hpo Gyi 
1703 - 1727 Sao Yi Khan Hpa Sunt Aung 
1727 - 1746 Sao Chow Piam Hpa  
1746 - 1757 Sao Hseng Tern Möng 
1757 - 1760 Sao Khan Hpo            (d. 1760)
1760 - .... Sao Hseng Sunt Hpa Wad Möng 
.... - .... Sao Pon Khone Gyi
.... - 1782 Sao Hti Kyaung
1782 - 1813 Sao Haw Nga
1813 - 1827 Sao Leik Hkam
1827 - 1834 Sao Aung Ba -Regent
1834 - 22 Oct 1880 Sao Shwe Maung
1880 - 1893 Sao Nyi Khant
1893 - 1899 Sao Khan Mun  
1899 - 1910 Sao Myat Htan (b. 1860) 
1910 - 1959 Sao Hkun Hsawng

References

External links
"Gazetteer of Upper Burma and the Shan states"
The Imperial Gazetteer of India

Shan States